is a manga series by Hideyuki Kikuchi. The story has been adapted into an anime film directed by Yoshimichi Furukawa. The film was originally licensed by Central Park Media and then later licensed by ADV Films.

Storyline
The story involves the town of Kabuki-cho, home of a resistance faction called Messiah. In the futuristic setting, Kabuki-cho is one of the last places of freedom because the Persona Century Corporation has taken control of the majority of the Earth. Kabuki-cho is hence known as "The Dark Side of Tokyo". Furthermore, a mysterious stranger called Darkside appears to protect the citizens of Kabuki-cho.

Release
The manga was published by Akita Shoten into two volumes between September 1988 and December 1988. The series was rereleased three times in special one-volume editions: on November 22, 1993; on May 10, 2002; and on March 16, 2012.

Darkside Blues was adapted into a film by J.C. Staff under the direction of Yoriyasu Kogawa and based on a script by Mayori Sekijima. It was released theatrically by Toho on October 8, 1994. Central Park Media licensed it for a North American audience and first released it in VHS on May 6, 1997.

Reception 
Helen McCarthy in 500 Essential Anime Movies calls the film "one of the most atmospheric films" of the 1990s. She praises the design, but states that "the luxuriant designs  are almost outdone by the well-crafted background track, with some superior foley editing and jazzy, atmospheric music".

References

External links

1988 manga
1994 anime films
1990s science fiction films
Action anime and manga
ADV Films
ADV Manga
Akita Shoten manga
Central Park Media
Hideyuki Kikuchi
J.C.Staff
Japanese science fiction films
Science fiction anime and manga